Gays for Trump is an American LGBT organization that supports the former U.S. president Donald Trump and his administration. Peter Boykin is the founder and serves as president of the organization.

Activities
On July 19, 2016, Gays for Trump hosted a party, called "Wake Up!", at the Wolstein Center, in Cleveland, Ohio, during the 2016 Republican National Convention. Speakers at the party were Milo Yiannopoulos and Pam Geller and the VIP guests at the party were Ann Coulter, Amy Kremer, Lisa De Pasquale, Genevieve Wood, Geert Wilders, and Roger Stone. Richard B. Spencer also attended the party.

On January 20, 2017, Gays for Trump hosted an inauguration party, called "Gays for Trump DeploraBall Gala", which was held at the Bolger Center Hotel in Potomac, Maryland. The party celebrated the inauguration of Donald Trump to the presidency of the United States.

On March 4, 2018, Gays for Trump held a national "March4Trump" rally in the District of Columbia.

Gays for Trump events have been funded by Jeff Giesea.

See also
 DeploraBall
 Deplorable Pride
 LGBT conservatism in the United States
 LGBT protests against Donald Trump

References

Further reading

External links

 

LGBT conservatism in the United States
LGBT political advocacy groups in the United States
Presidency of Donald Trump